Coleophora viburniella is a moth of the family Coleophoridae. It is found in the United States, including Pennsylvania and Ohio.

The larvae feed on the leaves of Viburnum prunifolium and Viburnum cassinoides. They create a composite leaf case.

References

viburniella
Moths of North America
Moths described in 1861